Chrissie Watts is a fictional character from the BBC soap opera EastEnders, played by Tracy-Ann Oberman. She first appeared on 29 April 2004 and transpired to be the second wife of the show's "most enduring character", Den Watts (Leslie Grantham) - thus ended up becoming a prominent regular for the next 18 months. In 2005, Chrissie was the focus of one of "the programme's biggest and most high-profile narratives" when she murdered her husband in self-defense at the end of the special 20th anniversary episode. The broadcast, airing on 18 February, was watched by 14.34 million people - with "almost 60% of possible viewers" tuning in to see Chrissie killing Den. The character was credited by former head of BBC Drama Serials, Mal Young, as "anchoring the success of the anniversary storyline", and was described on the news programme BBC Breakfast as the "centrepiece" of the show, with the on-screen drama playing out over the course of the year and culminating in Chrissie's departure on 9 December 2005.

Chrissie Watts was created by the production team to be more the "equal" of her notorious and villainous husband than his long-suffering first wife, Angie (Anita Dobson). The character was described by Oberman as being like Angie "but with 15 more years of feminism behind her", and was hailed by the TV editor of the Evening Standard as "the only strong woman left in Walford". She became well known for her deviousness and "scheming", echoing the traits of her husband, with the official EastEnders website characterising her as "happy to play mind games" and "often two steps ahead" of Den. As part of the Watts family and the last of its major members to have appeared on the show, Chrissie's storylines explored her tumultuous marriage to Den; bonding with his adopted daughter Sharon (Letitia Dean) and her two half-siblings, Dennis Rickman (Nigel Harman) and Vicki Fowler (Scarlett Alice Johnson); conspiring with Den to retake ownership of The Queen Victoria public house; forming a relationship with her boyfriend Jake Moon (Joel Beckett) following Den's murder; attempting to sell the Queen Vic to Jake's gangland boss Johnny Allen (Billy Murray) and local businessman Ian Beale (Adam Woodyatt); being blackmailed by young wayward Stacey Slater (Lacey Turner); and feuding with the rival Mitchell family. During her time on the show, Chrissie sparked numerous clashes with other female characters - such as her archenemy Sam Mitchell (Kim Medcalf); Stacey's cousin Kat (Jessie Wallace); Phil's girlfriend Kate Morton (Jill Halfpenny); Kat's daughter Zoe (Michelle Ryan); and Sam's mother Peggy (Barbara Windsor). It was noted by Oberman herself that Chrissie "had more fights on EastEnders than most women have in their whole lives", and was constantly scheming against those who got in her way - thereby earning her the sobriquet of "super-bitch".

Oberman won praise for her "three-dimensional portrayal of a classic soap bitch", with Chrissie hailed as "helping revive the show's fortunes that had been lagging somewhat in recent years". According to the Daily Mirror reporter Elizabeth Hassell, the character became a "national TV heroine" to viewers shortly after arriving, for standing up to the antics of her dastardly husband, and is most often cited as a "strong" and "clever" woman, as well as being "hard as nails" in "the grand tradition of landladies of The Queen Vic". Although generally well received by viewers, the character was described as a "ludicrous Lady MacBeth wannabe" by Jim Shelley of the Daily Mirror. Other critics have variously called Chrissie a "witch", "venomous", and the show's resident "black widow".

Storylines
Chrissie Watts first arrived in Albert Square — the community of Walford, a fictionalized borough in East London — in search of her estranged husband, Den Watts (Leslie Grantham). When they cross paths, it becomes clear that their marriage has grown sour ever since Den sold their bar in Spain and took the money without her consent. Den manages to persuade her to give their marriage another try, and to stay in Walford with him. Chrissie reluctantly agrees and is surprised to learn that he has an adopted daughter, Sharon (Letitia Dean), along with two other children: Dennis Rickman (Nigel Harman) and Vicki Fowler (Scarlett Alice Johnson). Later on, Chrissie learns that the reason Den was in Spain with her was because he was in exile after faking his own death back in 1989; Dennis' gangland boss Jack Dalton (Hywel Bennett), whom he recently killed nearly a year ago, tried unsuccessfully to have Den murdered for setting up his illegal activities on Dalton's criminal organization known "The Firm". In 1997, just around eight years after surviving The Firm's attempt to kill him, Den met Chrissie and the two would later get engaged and subsequently married.

As Chrissie settles herself in the square and recoups her marriage with Den, she manages to bond with his children by getting along with Dennis; helping out Vicki with her plans to enter fashion school; and working with Sharon in the management of their nightclub called "Angie's Den" — which Chrissie quickly learns is partly named after Den's deceased first wife Angie (Anita Dobson). She soon befriends a local ex-policewoman, Kate Morton (Jill Halfpenny), and the two work together as hairdressers in her nail salon. However, this does not last when Chrissie discovers that Den has been sleeping with Kate — which confirms her earlier suspicions about Den and his monogamous habits, despite his attempts to convince her that she is mistaken. Chrissie later exacts revenge on Kate by offering to give her a haircut, only to end up hacking most of her hair. She then proceeds to smash up the beauty salon in a rage, and slaps Kate that results in the pair fighting — which Den breaks up moments later; Chrissie promptly slaps Den and confronts him over his "dirty little secret". As she goes to leave the salon, Chrissie runs into Kate's boyfriend Ian Beale (Adam Woodyatt) and tells him that Den is Kate's "mystery man". She later departs Walford, distraught and hurt at Den's betrayal, but then returns due to being the co-owner of Kate's salon; ironically enough, Den has temporarily left the square to sort out his "loose ends" in Spain.

Following her return, Chrissie remains hostile towards Kate over her sleeping with Den — though the pair gradually call a truce and Kate soon leaves Walford to start a new life in Brighton. By then, Chrissie has grown concerned over Vicki's boyfriend Tommy Grant (Robert Cavanah) and especially since he is much older than her; Chrissie soon exposes Tommy as a liar and threatens to do him harm should he ever resume her relationship with Vicki, and he obliges to her demands. Den thereafter returns and plans to reconcile with Chrissie, but she not succumb to his charm offensive and continues to dismiss him. Chrissie soon reconsiders, however, when Den confines to her about his plan to bankrupt local businesswoman Sam Mitchell (Kim Medcalf) and her family from their ownership of The Queen Victoria public house; Den continues to explain that his intent on doing this, aside from settling the Mitchell and Watts family feud in favor of the latter, is because he and Sharon used to live happily together in The Queen Vic for over a decade and so he wishes to make amends for both of them — further stating to Chrissie that he cannot go through with this without her support. Chrissie eventually relents and agrees to help her husband accomplish his plot against the Mitchells, but then tells Den that she will kill him if he ever cheats on her again; Den seemingly accepts her word. Together, the couple successfully defraud Sam from everything her family owns around the square by blackmailing her lawyer Marcus Christie (Stephen Churchett) into conspiring with them against the Mitchells. Den then proceeds to move Chrissie and his children into the pub after evicting its landlord Alfie Moon (Shane Richie) and his family, consisting of his brother Spencer (Christopher Parker) and their grandmother, Nana (Hilda Braid), from the premises. On Christmas Day 2004, Chrissie helps prepare dinner for her stepfamily and Dennis' invited girlfriend Zoe Slater (Michelle Ryan). This starts off well until Dennis and Sharon reveal that they are in love with each other, much to Den's outrage, and the dinner ends in disaster before it even begins — which causes Chrissie to furiously lash out at everyone by telling them "Could you have not waited until after dinner!". Later on that night, Chrissie tries to calm Den to no avail when his daughters leave Walford; with Sharon deciding to do so at the best for Dennis' relationship with Zoe whilst Vicki joins her upon learning that Den does not love her as much as he loves Sharon.

From then onwards, Chrissie begins to feel left out by Den as he constantly ignores her since their disastrous Christmas meal. They soon appear to be getting along in better terms for the next few weeks, but in actuality Den has been sleeping with Zoe in order to get her pregnant for a potential baby with Dennis — as the reason why Sharon left on Christmas was because Den insisted that Zoe lie to Dennis about being pregnant with his child; while this did succeed in breaking up Dennis' romance with Sharon once she was told about Zoe's "pregnancy", Den's last-ditch plan was ultimately undone by Sharon deciding to leave Walford in order to accept Dennis and Zoe as opposed to them leaving instead. At somepoint when Chrissie goes out shopping, Dennis discovers Zoe's lie after catching her and Den in bed. He then goes to leave the square for a while, though not before bumping into Chrissie. When she asks if he is alright, Dennis tells Chrissie about Den sleeping with Zoe — which leaves her shocked as Dennis thereupon departs the square. Distraught and outraged with his betrayal once more, Chrissie plans to get revenge on Den in retaliation for his adultery. When she and Zoe cross paths, Chrissie learns that Zoe is pregnant with Den's baby and persuades her to abort the baby. Afterwards, Chrissie confronts Zoe about sleeping with Den by telling her that she knew the baby was his — thereby revealing her knowledge of him sleeping with Zoe. She seemingly accepts Zoe's explanation with what Den put her through and the two plan to exact revenge on him for good, with Sam agreeing to help out as well. The Watts' Christmas follow-up sparked a feud between Sam and Chrissie, though the pair form an uneasy alliance in order to take Den down. Their plan is nearly compromised as Sam and Chrissie argue about whichever of them will take the pub from Den, as Chrissie plans to intimidate her husband in singing the pub over to her — even though she already promised Sam that she'll help reclaim the Mitchells' stake of the premises. The two nonetheless proceed with the plan and ensuring that Zoe becomes part of it as well.

On the night of Den and Angie's 37th wedding anniversary, Chrissie executes her plan with Sam and Zoe — though not after feigning acceptance with Den's effort to reconcile their marriage after he takes her visit Angie's grave, where he promises Chrissie to start focusing on her more and put his past behind him. Den and Chrissie are soon left alone when all the punters leave the pub, though not before the couple find a metaled dog-shaped doorstop owned by Pauline Fowler (Wendy Richard), a sworn enemy of Den's since 1985 when he impregnated her teenage daughter Michelle (Susan Tully), an event which resulted in Vicki. The couple briefly talk about keeping it as Chrissie initially begins to romance with Den, but then her plan thereupon begins as Sam and Zoe arrive. Once Chrissie lets them in just as Den turns to face her, they stare menacingly towards him and Chrissie dismisses her husband's response that whatever is about to happen should be interesting — telling Den that "his luck just run out, and she hopes that he is in the mood for the worst night of his life". Den is unfazed as Chrissie makes it clear to knowing his deceit "long enough", before she and the other two woman take turns in confronting him over his again. Although Chrissie demands Den to give her power of attorney with The Queen Vic and goes on to admit that she helped Zoe abort his child, Den is again unmoved by this and  begins to enumerate the full extent of his crimes — from how he caused trouble for Sam prior to Chrissie's arrival, to conning the Mitchells out of everything they owned in the square, to forcing Zoe to lie to Dennis about being pregnant in order to split him and Sharon, to then blackmailing Zoe into sleeping with him so her lie towards Dennis can be maintained and Den would get payback on them for unintentionally driving Sharon out of Walford, and how it all broke his promise to Chrissie that he would not cheat on her again. Den then continues to taunt Chrissie with the assumption that he himself is her "weakness", before then revealing to Sam and Zoe that his wife collaborated in his scheme against the Mitchells. This causes Sam and Zoe to confront Chrissie even as the trio are still arguing with Den, which escalates when he tells them that Chrissie slept with him not long before they arrived to confront him at this very moment.

When Chrissie makes it clear that she will never reconcile with Den over his constant betrayal and nor will she end up being victimized in the same way how he treated Angie in the past, Den responds indifferently and admits to not caring how much trouble he has caused for everyone by telling Chrissie "there's not one single person around here who I give a toss about". Just before Den can react further, he is stunned when Sharon appears in the shadows — having just overheard everything her father had been admitting to Chrissie and her two accompanies. It soon transpires that while getting power of attorney from Den's ownership of the pub was merely part of Chrissie's revenge against him, her real plan was in fact to turn Sharon against him by tricking her into thinking that her father was ill — though she later says this is partly true because of his antics — and then getting her to overhear the full extent of his lies. This was because Chrissie, knowing that Sharon is the one person Den truly loves and only cares about, would literally hurt Den by ridding her husband from ever being loved and trust again by his favorite child. When Sharon berates Chrissie for getting her to discover about Den's antics despite the fact that she needed to never find out in the first place, Chrissie appears to sympathize with Sharon by stating that nobody was expecting her to be happy with the outcome for the sake of it — even though Chrissie tells Sharon that she just needed to know what her father was really like. Although Sharon is left unhappy with what Chrissie had done, she nevertheless accomplishes her revenge on Den by walking out on him and then disowning her father for the extent of his lies — before then leaving Walford in a taxi after rejecting Den's pleas for another chance for her to love and trust him again. Just as Sharon walked out on her father, Chrissie sarcastically wishes Den happy anniversary and Sam congratulates her: "I gotta hand it to you Chrissie, you're quite a bitch ain't ya!". Moments later, Den returns in the pub and Chrissie begins to taunt her husband that now he knows what it is like to be lose what he loves most and what it feels like to feel betrayed just as she felt it from him. After a moment of silence, Den — unable to contain his rage towards Chrissie for ultimately turning Sharon against him — ends up attacking his wife and strikes her head against the pub's fruit machines. Just as he prepares to do this again, Chrissie is saved by Zoe when she picks up Pauline's doorstop and ends up hitting Den on the head with it. Den collapses onto the ground just as Chrissie recuperates, and it becomes apparent that he is dead when Sam finds herself unable to examine a pulse on Den at Zoe's behest. Chrissie is momentarily shocked with what appears to be the prospect of Zoe killing Den, but quickly maintains her self-control when she overhears people walking past the pub and orders both Zoe and Sam to turn all the lights off and lock all the doors. A smug Chrissie starts to gloat that Den is dead, as if to say she has won. Den suddenly grabs her leg and hisses, "You'll never get me out of The Vic." so Chrissie picks up the doorstop and delivers a fatal blow to his head, secretly watched by Sam. The three women bury him in a hole in the pub's cellar, which is filled with cement the next morning.

Despite knowing that Zoe is innocent, Chrissie allows her to believe that she killed Den. This continues even when Sam confronts Chrissie that she saw her, and not Zoe, being the one to have killed Den in the end. Subsequently, a power struggle breaks out between the two as Sam and Chrissie each try to put Zoe on their side. They are initially shocked when the police visit each of the trio on the morning after Den's murder, but it soon transpires that the square's crime kingpin Sam's  ex-husband Andy Hunter (Michael Higgs) had died under an alleged suicide that same night; news of Andy's death quickly spread around Walford while Den's murder remains concealed from public knowledge. In response to this, Sam demands Chrissie reinstate the pub's ownership back to the Mitchells in exchange for her silence. During this time, Chrissie publicly accounts for Den's sudden absence by alleging that he has run off with another woman. She then manages to make her story convincing to the square by throwing his clothes into the street and then engaging in a bogus phone conversation with him in front of a packed pub. Chrissie soon begins a relationship with Alfie's cousin Jake (Joel Beckett). When Zoe begins to probe Chrissie over the outcome of Den's murder, Chrissie is able to have Zoe leave the Square. However, another setback emerges when Sam takes the doorstop that Chrissie used to kill Den and hides the murder weapon in her flat. She then proceeds to blackmail Chrissie by saying that unless the pub is given back to her, she will inform the police. Chrissie stalls for time, and eventually calls Sam's bluff, declaring that she will take Sam down with her if she goes to the police. Desperate, Sam tries to corner Chrissie by telling Zoe the truth. Zoe confronts Chrissie about this, but finds herself unable to change anything that Chrissie has staged in her favor; Zoe ends up leaving Walford for good and starts anew in Spain, but not before telling her mother Kat (Jessie Wallace) the truth about Den's murder. Following Zoe's departure, Kat confronts Chrissie with the knowledge that she killed Den and promises to bring her down should she disclose Zoe's involvement in any way.

Dennis and Sharon return to Walford in search of their father. Chrissie is unable to get them to leave Walford again, but is able to forge her friendship with Sharon over the belief that Den left the country with another woman. Chrissie also supports Sharon and Dennis when they decide to get married. By then, Sam is overwhelmed with frustration and desperation in her little efforts to win her conflict against Chrissie. After Chrissie taunts her once more, Sam gets drunk and goes against Kat's reservations in another attempt to get one over Chrissie. On the day Sharon and Dennis get married, Sam smashes up Den's grave and digs up his body in the hope that Chrissie will be sent down for his death; she ends up getting arrested after assaulting the pub's barmaid, Tracey (Jane Slaughter), in the midst of unearthing Den's corpse. When this becomes public knowledge, Den is officially pronounced dead and Chrissie feigns grief whilst also comforting Sharon over her loss. The police later take Chrissie to the station for questioning after Sam tells them everything about Den's murder. However, this backfires when Den's bloodstains are found under Sam's sink and her story constantly changes as a result. Chrissie seizes an opportunity to incriminate Sam for the crime by convincing Kat to get her cousin, Stacey (Lacey Turner), to give the police a false alibi that Zoe and Chrissie were with her on the night Den died. Feeling that she has no other way to protect her daughter, Kat agrees as that means Zoe is cleared from the police's viewpoint on her involvement in Den's murder. Resultingly, Sam is arrested and held in prison for Den's murder while Chrissie appears to have seemingly got away with the crime.

In the build-up to Den's funeral, Chrissie is unnerved when Sam's mother Peggy (Barbara Windsor) returns to Walford. They initially get along despite Peggy's animosity towards Sharon over their longstanding feud, but then Sam's cousin Billy (Perry Fenwick) informs Peggy about the events of Den's murder and how Sam is suspected of committing the crime. When Peggy goes to visit her daughter in prison to confirm this theory, Sam tells her mother that Chrissie killed Den and framed her for the crime. This prompts Peggy to go looking for Chrissie, who in the meantime has helped Sharon along with all the other attendees for Den's funeral set up the service; Pauline and her longtime neighbour Pat Harris (Pam St Clement) are among those who attend the funeral. Chrissie prepares to deliver a eulogy on Den when Peggy arrives, disruptively brands Chrissie a "murderer" and telling everyone that she killed Den. The situation escalates when Peggy slaps Chrissie, causing her to fall into Den's grave on top of the coffin. When they have another confrontation in the pub, Sharon and everyone else believes Chrissie over Peggy. From then onwards, the pair develop a feud as Peggy resolves to exonerate Sam while Chrissie is determined to not let the Mitchells get the best of her or destroy Sharon's trust in her — even when Dennis later realizes that Peggy and Sam are telling the truth about Chrissie killing Den. Following yet another quarrel at a party where Peggy accuses Kat of helping Chrissie frame Sam just to cover-up Zoe's involvement, Stacey learns the truth and starts blackmailing Chrissie for money. Chrissie reluctantly complies until she later decides to stand up to Stacey. When she does so, however, Stacey ends up returning all the money she extorted from Chrissie — telling her that she has no conscious unlike the rest of the square after what she did to Den.

Despite facing the pressure from both Peggy and the Slaters over the circumstances with her innocence in Den's murder, Chrissie still finds support in Jake — who has yet to discover the truth about what really happened. Eventually, Jake questions Chrissie and she admits to killing Den. At first Jake is horrified, but then comes to realize how Den betrayed Chrissie and that she would never have killed him had he treated her better in the first place. Chrissie is relieved to have earned Jake's forgiveness when he professes his love for her, but then contemplates on turning herself into the police. Jake attempts to stop Chrissie from doing this, and only manages to do so when he reveals a secret of his own; that Jake has been partially coping with a similar situation that Chrissie has been enduring for months now. When Chrissie confronts Jake over his secret, she is shocked to learn that Jake had witnessed his mob boss Johnny Allen (Billy Murray) murder Andy on the night she killed Den. Following Andy's murder, Johnny had initially planned to kill Jake and his brother Danny (Jake Maskall) after the latter sets fire to his house that triggered a past where Johnny's former wife Stephanie and their daughter Scarlett were killed in an arson attack; the Moon Brothers were spared after Johnny forced them to leave Walford, but did allow Jake to return and help Alfie with Nana's latest illness battle. As her relationship with Jake continues once more, Chrissie plans to sell the pub to Johnny and attempts to get Jake to pressure his boss into agreeing — further asserting that she now has leverage on Johnny over Andy's murder. Jake reluctantly complies, and a business partnership ensues between Chrissie and Johnny over their common competition against Peggy due to the fact that the Mitchell matriarch herself resents Johnny over their past. Peggy continues to cause stress for Chrissie when she rebuffs the former's attempt to convince her to not sell the pub to Johnny, whom Chrissie later visits to see if he could deal with Peggy. When Johnny refuses, Chrissie reveals that she knows he killed Andy and appears ready to blackmail him. However, Johnny responds that he knows that Chrissie killed Den and plans to end their partnership in retribution to her threats. Jake accosts Chrissie for attempting to blackmail Johnny, and she is forced to apologize to them both in order to try and not let Peggy get the best of her. Johnny agrees to continue the deal, but warns Chrissie about threatening him next time. Johnny also tells Chrissie that he is acting on a third party, and that Peggy is likely to be aware since she is campaigning against them and that they are dealing with a common enemy. Moments later, Chrissie witnesses Peggy publicly open up Johnny's gangland activities just as his daughter Ruby (Louisa Lytton) walks in to learn the truth about this.

Sometime later, Chrissie and Johnny are equally alarmed with the entire square when Peggy's two hardman son Phil (Steve McFadden) and Grant (Ross Kemp) return to Walford to help with their mother's campaign for Sam's exoneration. Chrissie first interacts with the Mitchell Brothers when Grant confronts her in the pub one night over Sam's wrongful incarnation for Den's murder. Grant then attacks Dennis when he intervenes, but then Sharon arrives to see what is happening; she defends Chrissie against the Mitchell Brothers by kicking them out of the pub. Even when Phil and Grant continue to pressure Chrissie over what she did to Den and Sam respectively, Chrissie remains unfazed as Sharon still supports her. This is soon tested, however, when Grant convinces Sharon to visit Sam in prison to hear her version of what happened the night Den died. After initially refusing to believe the Mitchells again afterwards, Sharon finally learns the truth when Chrissie innocuously lets slip of the last words that she said to Den on the night he died "I may not be the first woman in your life, but I'm defiantly going to be the last!"; Sam had earlier told Sharon this during their conversation in prison. When Chrissie is notified that Sharon has been spending most of her time with Phil and Grant lately, she realizes that Sharon knows the truth at last and is distraught to accept this upon having seen Sharon think so well of her. In a stressful state, Chrissie begins to make mistakes as she plans with Jake to flee the country to avoid getting caught by the authorities. They later have an argument at Johnny's nightclub, "Scarlets", where she ends up describing to him how she killed Den with the doorstop. Unbeknownst to the pair, however, Johnny catches this on CCTV and delightfully tells Jake that he has a recording of her confession. Chrissie later goes to visit Johnny and asks to get the money for their deal on the pub right away, but Johnny instead takes advantage by telling Chrissie that she must sleep with him in order to get the money. Chrissie tries to resist by reminding Johnny of her knowledge that he killed Andy, before later bringing up the fact that his former mistress Tina Stewart (Charlotte Avery) had just recently broke up with him over his recent affair with Amy (Nina Fry) — one of his barmaids at Scarletts. Johnny calls her buff, however, and Chrissie initially complies until she does not fully go through with it by stating how she does not want to hurt Jake. In response to this, Johnny tells Chrissie that she will not receive the money and ends up telling Phil and Grant about the tape.

As the Mitchells work with Sharon and Dennis to break Stacey's alibi whilst attempting to get Johnny to surrender the tape to them, Chrissie learns that Ian is the mystery buyer for the pub whom Johnny had been acting for as a "third party". Stacey's alibi is eventually broken and the police visit Chrissie once more to question her. She is able to stall them and the police leave with not enough evidence to prove Chrissie's guilt on Den's murder. This later prompts Jake to try and stop Phil and Grant from getting the tape by reluctantly colluding with Johnny to kill them, but they fail and the Mitchell Brothers seize the tape. Jake rushes to alert Chrissie, and they secretly meet up with Ian and his fiancé Jane Collins (Laurie Brett) to complete the sale of the pub. Afterwards, Chrissie and Jake manage to discreetly leave the square on their way to the airport. However, one of the pub's regular punters Patrick Trueman (Rudolph Walker) stops them leaving and Billy discovers this. They later inform the police of which airport Chrissie is heading off to in her plan to leave the country. At the airport, Chrissie awaits for Jake to return with the tickets. Just as he walks towards her and Chrissie starts to book her flight, she finds herself confronted by Sharon and the police. After they exchange words, Sharon punches Chrissie before the police then arrest Chrissie for Den's murder.

Chrissie says that she will only co-operate in exchange for a meeting with Sharon. This is earned, and she tries to make Sharon realize why she killed her father, to no avail. She reveals that she forged Den's signature on the document in which Den handed over the pub to Chrissie, thus the pub legally belongs to Sharon and not Ian as he originally thought. Later on, Sam is released from prison and Sharon makes amends with the Mitchells by selling the pub to them; however, their victory is short lived when Sam is forced to leave the country due to the police viewing her as an accessory to Den's murder despite Chrissie's confession. Weeks later, Jake visits Chrissie in jail and asks her to marry him. She finds out that he has lost the £25,000 that was to be her bail money, and storms out of the visiting room, calling Jake an idiot. Chrissie soon decides to plot revenge on Sharon for sending her to prison by trying to force her stepdaughter to testify in court about what Den was really like, wanting to see Sharon crumble at confessing how he cheated and supposedly beat her mother — even though Den had never really domestically abused Angie despite the extent of their turbulent and volatile marriage. After a week in prison, Chrissie decides to call off her plan when it becomes clear that she still thinks of Sharon as a daughter just like her father did. She dismisses her solicitor and pleads guilty to murder, which partly clears Sam and Zoe respectively for the crime. In the end, Chrissie is sentenced to life imprisonment for Den's murder. Jake later visits her in prison again and Chrissie convinces him to not visit him again due to her sentence, and he reluctantly agrees despite professing his love for her. After bidding an emotional farewell to each other, Chrissie watches Jake leave the visiting room and she herself walks back into her prison cell with a contented smile.

In 2006, on the day Jake ends up leaving Walford in October that year, Chrissie is mentioned when Jake argues with Ruby about Johnny's death and his crimes. Ruby protests that Jake was involved with Chrissie and that he helped her cover up Den's murder, although he insists that it was an accident and that she did not mean to kill him. They also mention the fact that Johnny had Danny kill Dennis when the latter and Sharon clashed with Johnny himself not long after Chrissie's imprisonment, and weeks later Johnny was arrested for the murders of Andy and Dennis at Ruby's urging — though not before Jake had killed Danny to stop him from murdering Phil and Grant on Johnny's orders. The result of Jake killing Danny has forced him to undergo the same kind of ordeal that Chrissie had endured this time prior to him leaving the square following a quarrel with Stacey's hotheaded brother Sean (Robert Kazinsky) just months later.

In 2009, after Sam (now played by Danniella Westbrook) returns to Walford ends up getting arrested for her involvement in Den's murder on September that year, she quickly assumes the worst by expressing fear and resentment with the possibility of running into Chrissie in prison. This never happened, though, as Sam is later released from custody and Chrissie hasn't been seen or heard of since then.

Creation and casting
The creation of a second wife for Den Watts (Leslie Grantham), the show's "most enduring character" and "one of the best-loved villains in soap history", came 15 years after his first wife had departed the screen. Angie Watts (Anita Dobson) was an iconic character in British television history, with her troublesome marriage to Den largely anchoring EastEnders extraordinary success when it was launched in the mid-80s. In an interview shortly after she first appeared on-screen as Chrissie Watts, Tracy-Ann Oberman noted how coming into the show after Angie was an intimidating prospect and "a big act to follow".

Casting for the character was hectic, with Oberman describing the process as a "whirlwind" affair. The role of the second Mrs Den Watts was highly sought after with Oberman eventually beating out high-profile stars like Patsy Kensit, Cheryl Baker and Joanna Lumley for the part. In a 2004 'Star Chat' interview featured in The People, Oberman commented on her casting: "I couldn't have wished for a better part. I mean the Watts family are a national institution. When I realised I was auditioning for the role of Dirty Den's wife, my jaw just dropped. I never thought I'd get it. Amazing, swanky actresses, like Joanna Lumley and Patsy Kensit, were all considered, but Leslie Grantham and I had great chemistry from the off and I think he said: 'I want her.'" Oberman was on holiday when she received a call saying she had been cast in the role and was required to be on set the next Tuesday. All told the audition process had taken just two weeks, with Oberman beginning filming a mere ten days after her initial screen test. In fact the schedule was so tight that Oberman was on set and taping scenes before a contract had even been signed.

The arrival of Chrissie Watts was announced barely a month before she was set to first appear on-screen, and came at a time when EastEnders was undergoing immense media criticism and falling ratings. The rush of casting meant Oberman had little time to process the enormity of the part she had taken on, declaring: "my feet haven't even touched the ground yet. [...] I haven't had time to think about what this role is going to do to my life! I'm very excited to be part of such a fantastic show and one I have been a fan of for many years." She admitted, however, to being "slightly intimidated" by the high media profile and press interest surrounding the show at the time. Indeed, joining EastEnders "proved to be something of a baptism of fire for Oberman", as she was playing opposite Leslie Grantham whose recent return to the show had been a highly publicised event. Twenty-four hours after Chrissie's first episode went to air a scandal surrounding Grantham hit the tabloid papers. According to Oberman, the atmosphere on set the next day "was a bit tense" but, she added, "the Watts are pulling together and we're getting on with it and working". Looking back on the incident after she had left EastEnders, Oberman remarked, "I respect Leslie for fronting it out; he emerged from his dressing room and started working. No one mentioned the story. That's life in EastEnders; the machine never stops."

The increasing prominence of Chrissie in EastEnders meant that Oberman, more than most, had to endure the gruelling schedule of working on a soap, taping up to twenty scenes a day. Although she was only in EastEnders for 18 months, such was the centrality of Chrissie to the show and storylines Oberman felt she had done 4 years worth of acting, noting that by the time of her departure "Chrissie has packed into a year what most soap characters do in three." This all came during a period of great uncertainty for the show; media criticism and negative publicity created immense pressure behind-the-scenes, with large-scale cast culls and speculation in the press and on the set over who may be next. In an interview with the Sunday Mirror, Oberman described the atmosphere as like a "vacuum", with the cast "just waiting to see what the next stage is – It can be a bit tense but it's exciting. I really don't know what's going to happen." However, the prominent role of Chrissie in the show as it moved forward meant that Oberman came out of the uncertainty with more to show than most, receiving an improved deal and extending her contract for a year, with the BBC's head of drama John Yorke declaring he had "big plans" for Chrissie.

Character development

Personality
Unlike Den's first wife Angie, Chrissie "has a strong will and fights for what she wants". However, as Oberman noted, "there is enough of Angie in Chrissie to see that Den likes a certain type of strong woman. Chrissie is Angie with 15 years of feminism behind her", explaining in an interview with Radio 4: "I like to think of Chrissie as Angie with benefits... She's his [Den's] equal a bit more than Angie was." Oberman later expanded: "Chrissie, unlike Angie, won't hit the bottle as soon as Den starts playing away. She's proved she's ready to sit and wait for her revenge. She's a great, strong character". Talking to the Daily Mirror shortly after appearing on-screen for the first time in April, Oberman declared, "Chrissie is the sort of woman I'd really like to be friends with... She's an Essex girl who was brought up in a family of brothers, so she knows how to work men. She understands that what they say is not always what they mean." In her official character profile, Chrissie is portrayed as someone "happy to play mind games" and "often two steps ahead of her husband", being described as "the type of person to be your best friend. But if you cross her, she'll get her own back in the end." Her strong-willed persona has led reviewers to label the character as "venomous", "devious", and "hard as nails" in "the grand tradition of landladies of the Queen Vic", manipulating others to ensure matters go her way. As the "scheming" figure of the show, she was described as a "witch" and "super-bitch", but was also represented as "strong" and "clever" woman. Executive producer Kate Harwood characterised Chrissie as a survivor, someone who "thinks on her feet" whatever the situation. Oberman has stated that she was thrilled to be "playing such a strong female character", whom she described as not a bad person at heart but one willing to stand and "fight in her corner".

An aspect of Chrissie's personality is her wardrobe and style, with EastEnders costume designer Di Humphreys noting that "Chrissie's clothes reflect her strong, upfront character." Oberman explained how the character's fashion sense was informed by her own observations of British expatriates: "When I heard I had the part of Chrissie I was on holiday in Spain, where she had been living, and I remember looking at all the ex-pat women, and thinking how co-ordinated they are. Their hair is always perfect, their bags match their gloves and shoes and scarves." The show's make-up artist, Elizabeth Armistead, has also spoken of the way Chrissie's "glamorous, polished look" informs her characterisation and personality: "Chrissie's a confident person who rarely leaves anything to chance. Even in moments of despair, though her facial expression reflects her turmoil, she never has a hair out of place." The look was part of a desire to represent the character as a "strong" and "forceful" figure, with one interviewer describing Chrissie as "quite flashy" and "glam". According to Humphreys, this is manifested in "Chrissie’s outfits, [which] are a mixture of designer and High Street... Chrissie's got a great sense of style. She makes High Street clothes look made to measure." Oberman felt Chrissie's fashion sensibilities to be a critical element of the character: "she's like Angie with 15 more years of Sex and The City thrown in", referring to an American television serial notable for its fashion. Even before stepping foot on set, Oberman spent eight hours with Humphreys shopping for Chrissie's clothes at Selfridges where they "spent a fortune!" The character's highly stylised representation on-screen earned Oberman the award for best-dressed soap star in 2005, and reflected Chrissie's new-found role as the "voluptuous landlady" of The Queen Vic. In the media the character was widely regarded as the show's ultimate femme fatale and resident "sex symbol", being described by John Dingwall of the Daily Record as Walford's "black widow".

In an interview with the Sunday Mirror, Oberman revealed that she was attracted to the mesh of sexuality and humour in the personality of Chrissie, declaring, "What I really like is she's got the sex and dry sarcasm". Speaking to the official EastEnders website, she expanded on the importance of Chrissie's sense of humour and wit to her "feisty" characterisation: "What I love about Chrissie is that she's a good strong, funny female character... she's got a really good sense of humour which is necessary to deal with Den. She's very good at wisecracks. Den has the one-liners, but Chrissie bats them right back." Chrissie's barbed and biting remarks became a prominent feature of the character; even when cornered by Den's adopted daughter Sharon Watts (Letitia Dean) after attempting to flee the country, she remarks: "You really are your father's daughter, Sharon. No shaking you off either."

Mrs Den Watts
Chrissie entered the show as the estranged wife of Den Watts, and was deliberately presented as "very different to the first Mrs. Watts." When EastEnders began in 1985 viewers had watched Den's affairs and manipulation gradually take their toll on his wife, Angie, who was unable to compete in the games he played. Chrissie was intended to be a contrast to her predecessor; where Angie turned to alcohol, Chrissie was more Den's "equal" and could be just as devious and calculating, with Oberman observing how "Angie was all knee-jerk reaction, but Chrissie is more of a plotter and schemer – just like Den." Comparing Den's two wives, Oberman remarked: "Chrissie's much cooler than Angie. Her motto is, 'revenge is a dish best served cold'. She's tougher than Angie and she can hold it together much better." Indeed, according to Oberman, producers deliberately wanted to take Den's second marriage down a different path to his first; whereas the relationship between Den and Angie had been likened to Richard Burton and Elizabeth Taylor, that between Den and Chrissie was modelled on Spencer Tracy and Katharine Hepburn. Like Den, Chrissie had an acerbic tongue and their relationship was marked by verbal fencing in the manner of Hepburn and Tracy: "What's great is that they've written Den an equal", Oberman noted, "It'll be interesting to see their little sparring matches." The attraction was intended to be mutual, unlike Den's one-sided marriage to Angie. Trying to win Chrissie around into giving their marriage another try, Den declared: "I know we've got a great relationship even when we're tearing lumps out of each other, you give as good as you get and that's the sort of marriage I've always wanted". Commenting on the complicated nature of their relationship, Oberman observed,

The equality of their marriage was dramatically underscored towards the end of 2004, when Den, as a sign of faith and in an effort to win back her sympathies, revealed to Chrissie his plans to reclaim The Queen Victoria public house by scamming the rival Mitchell family: "If you ever needed proof that we're in this together or how badly I need you in my life, this is it. I wasn't going to show this to another soul, but I'm showing you because you're my wife; because it's me and you together."

In an interview with the official EastEnders website, Oberman detailed the background dynamic to Chrissie and Den's relationship as it existed before their appearance on the show: "They were a real match for each other and ran a successful wine bar. The couple made a good team, but he was always going off with other women. She'd end up leaving him, but they'd always end up back together." Den's womanising and philandering nature was deliberately set against Chrissie's strong and forceful personality, and culminated on-screen in his affair with Kate Mitchell (Jill Halfpenny). The plot was praised by television editor Ru Green as being one of the "better storylines" during an otherwise weak year for the show, with media attention at the time profiling Chrissie's dramatic plans for revenge. The climax, which saw Chrissie cut off Kate Mitchell's hair in retribution for the affair, was a highlight for Oberman and an important dramatic milestone for her character: "cutting off Jill Halfpenny's hair in the salon... was a really great episode. I loved working with Jill and I think that put Chrissie on the map."

Chrissie left Den but was eventually convinced to give their marriage another try. She also saw the ebb and flow of Den and Chrissie's marriage as a reflection of the mental gameplaying that was so prominent in their characterisations: "I think there's a challenge in it, and I think she would like to be the one who would ultimately tame him." As Den's equal, Chrissie was intended to be a challenge to his propensity for intellectual games, having already outwitted the show's prior top dog, Phil Mitchell (Steve McFadden). Den had seen little threat in his first wife's aptitude, but considered Chrissie to be "as sharp as they come". Indeed, Den's extra-marital dalliances were used by writers to showcase and highlight Chrissie's "strong-willed persona". When Zoe Slater (Michelle Ryan) chastised Den for caring only about Chrissie's reaction should she learn of their affair, Den fired back: "And so should you. You think I've treated you badly? Well you don't have a clue what's going to happen if she ever finds out! The best thing you can do is keep your mouth shut."

Witches of Walford
In November 2004 it was announced that Leslie Grantham had not renewed his contract and that Den Watts would depart EastEnders in what was described by The Mirror as an "explosive" and final exit. The storyline became one of "the program's biggest and most high-profile narratives", dominating the entire year, and made the character of Chrissie Watts the "centrepiece" of the show. The lead-up to the 20th anniversary episode in February was an immensely high-profile affair, with Imogen Ridgway and Richard Godwin of the Evening Standard dryly observing that "unless you've been living on Titan you probably know that EastEnders is 20 years old and Dirty Den is once again leaving Albert Square." Events in the show centre around Chrissie manipulating Sam Mitchell and Zoe Slater in a plot of revenge against Den, the three women being dubbed the "Witches of Walford" by the popular press in reference to Shakespeare's play, Macbeth. The prelude to Den's death further highlighted and showcased Chrissie's manipulative character and conniving personality in her representation as a "strong" and "forceful" figure. When she secretly learns that Zoe is pregnant by Den, she plays on Zoe's insecurities and vulnerabilities and "coerces" her into having an abortion. The pregnancy represented a double blow to Chrissie as Den had always resisted having children with her, and as with Kate Mitchell, Chrissie determines to teach Zoe a harsh lesson about "messing with other people's husbands". The possessive nature of his wife was noted by Den, who warns Zoe that Chrissie "tends to blame the women that lead me astray."

The final confrontation between husband and wife played out during the special episode marking the show's 20th anniversary. Such was public interest in the storyline that the production team reportedly took to "fiercely guarding" scripts, "so that even the cast weren't sure how they would play out", with "the show's producers shooting multiple endings to ensure the cast couldn't leak the plot." During the hour-long broadcast Chrissie leads Sam and Zoe into facing Den, with 14.34 million people watching her deliver the fatal blow to her husband after a violent struggle. Oberman "begged the producers to let Chrissie do it to prove she wasn't a sap", adding "It was a real rush for me."  In the aftermath of Den's death, Chrissie became an increasingly "transformed" and colder figure, as the character "played" and "spun" her way "out of every situation". She proceeds to trick Zoe into taking the blame for Den's murder, and continuously outmanoeuvres Sam in the latter's efforts to get back the Vic. Oberman felt this to be a noticeable shift in Chrissie's characterisation, with the show's writers taking "her down a darker route", as in one notable scene depicting Chrissie standing over Den's grave, and confiding to him of her plans.

The storyline commenced its conclusion with the return of the Mitchell family to help Sam, who had been framed by Chrissie for the murder of Den; events were to culminate in Chrissie's departure from the show, with producers telling Oberman that when she leaves "later this year, it's going to be one of the most explosive storylines ever. Like Den before her, Chrissie had little trouble outsmarting the Mitchells, her clashes with Peggy (Barbara Windsor), Phil, and Grant (Ross Kemp) part of the final showdown between the Watts and Mitchells that, in the words of one presenter, "grips the nation". The story's climax, resulting in Chrissie's exit from Walford, was such a considerable moment for the show that BBC bosses took the highly unusual step of keeping the "manner of her departure" a "complete mystery even to the soap's [own] producers", with reports claiming that "no less than four separate storylines [are] to be filmed for her departure from EastEnders". Commenting at the time to NOW, Oberman said, "I think Chrissie deserves to get away with murder. She was heavily provoked. I'd love to see her make it to Argentina... [and] run a beach bar with a young Latin lover by her side." The immense public focus on the figure of Chrissie was used by executives in the intensifying ratings war, with the BBC "using the Chrissie Watts departure as the major weapon in our armoury... to snatch back viewers" from rival soaps.

Victim or villain?
To mark Chrissie's departure from the show, BBC Three aired a special episode of EastEnders Revealed on 22 September 2005. Entitled "Chrissie Watts: Victim or Villain?" the episode featured comments from Oberman, Grantham (Den), Dean (Sharon), Medcalf (Sam), Beckett (Jake), and Windsor (Peggy) profiling Chrissie and exploring the nuanced nature of the character. "A lot of viewers, and myself," Oberman later remarked, "really wanted Chrissie to get away with it, especially as Den was such a monster. But soap and film noir have a lot in common – the bad girls have to be punished." However, critics considered Chrissie to be a "three-dimensional soap bitch", rather than a flat pantomime figure. Despite having killed her father, Chrissie highly valued her friendship with Sharon, declaring at one point: "my friendship with you is the only good thing to come out of my relationship with Den, and I mean that!" Oberman characterised Chrissie as "part victim part villain", declaring "I think of her as a villain with a heart". She felt that, although "no excuse" for murder, Chrissie was driven to what she did: "She's not a cold blooded murderer, it was all done in a fit of pique", and that "these characters are made, not born." Chrissie was haunted by the alcoholic fate of Den's first wife, which she vowed at Angie's grave to avoid. But in spite of her efforts, and indeed because of them, she failed, as she came to recognise: "You know it's funny; when Den used to talk about Ange he used to describe her as this weak sad, cow. And I used to think 'not like me, oh no, not like me'. Who's having the last laugh now, Ange?"

Reception
As the wife of Den Watts, one of British soap's biggest figures, Chrissie was a high-profile character, with the turns in her storylines regularly splashed across the tabloid papers, becoming, in the words of reporter Katherine Hassell, "a national TV heroine after she arrived in Albert Square in 2004 as the wife of the resurrected Dirty Den". The character's tough and steely persona was widely cited by TV critics, such as Imogen Ridgway of The Evening Standard, who felt Chrissie to be the "dominant female character" in the show, maintaining an increasingly threatened EastEnders tradition of the independent, forceful female figure: "For a soap originally underpinned by dominant female characters, it seems odd that Chrissie Watts is apparently the only strong woman left in Walford".

Oberman won praise for her "three-dimensional portrayal of a classic soap bitch", with Chrissie hailed as "helping revive the show's fortunes that had been lagging somewhat in recent years". According to the Daily Mirror reporter Elizabeth Hassell, the character became a "national TV heroine" to viewers shortly after arriving, for standing up to the antics of her dastardly husband, and is most often cited as a "strong" and "clever" woman, as well as being "hard as nails" in "the grand tradition of landladies of The Queen Vic". Although generally well received by viewers, the character was derided by Jim Shelley of the Daily Mirror. Other critics have variously called Chrissie a "witch", "venomous", and the show's resident "black widow".

The storyline involving Den's death was among the most prominent of the decade, and generated intense media and public interest. Looking back on the period, Oberman noted the remarkable nature of the story:

The special 1-hour 20th anniversary episode where Chrissie killed Den was watched by 14.34 million people on the night it was broadcast, attracting "almost 60% of possible viewers", with a peak share of 57.8%. It was the highest rated episode of EastEnders that year, and has since only been bested by a showing on Christmas Day 2007 (which drew anomalous large audiences for all BBC One programmes that year), and the 25th anniversary episode. However final figures for the broadcast, which factored in digital and recorded viewings, rose to over 17 million making it the highest rated screening of a British soap since 2003. The episode received a massive amount of media interest, and was highly praised for displaying "some of the tightest, funniest dialogue this soap has seen". Oberman revealed that she could not stop laughing during filming of the scenes, as Grantham's hair was stuck to the floor: "We did lots of takes and poor Leslie was on his back for hours with fake blood all around his head. The liquid dried and his hair was glued to the floor. When he got up it ripped his hair out!"

The aftermath dominated EastEnders in 2005 and helped to revive the fortunes of the show. According to the former head of BBC Drama Serials, Mal Young, this was dependent on the character of Chrissie, who was responsible for "anchoring the success of the anniversary storyline". A similar sentiment was expressed by Ian Hyland in the Sunday Mirror, who although critical of the convuluted plot felt EastEnders was improving "mainly because Chrissie is doing her best to rescue the fallout from the storyline dirty bomb Den's murder has become", and described the character as performing a "rescue act" on the show. However, Jim Shelley of the Daily Mirror was highly critical of Chrissie, calling her "the ludicrous Lady MacBeth wannabe", and felt her departure was ennabling EastEnders to move forward. In contrast, the TV editor of The Daily Telegraph Telegraph hailed Chrissie as "helping revive the show's fortunes that had been lagging somewhat in recent years".

Oberman has described her time on the show as "hectic". During Chrissie's tenure there was constant shuffling behind the scenes, with three different executive producers taking the reins, with each new producer bringing in new writing teams. Uncertainty came to be manifested in writing and scripts, with character inconsistencies and plot holes working their way into production. One notable example was ownership of The Queen Victoria, with Chrissie legally owner of half the pub after Den legitimately signed over the deed before they renewed their vows in February. However, in November this fact was forgotten, with Chrissie represented as forging Den's signature to nullify her ownership of the pub which legally became Sharon's. Problems with the script did not escape Oberman, who criticised her character's storylines after she left the show, saying the writers "must have been on crack", adding how "plots didn't make logical or emotional sense – but they said, 'That's the soap convention, dear, get used to it'". She also considered some scenes to be irresponsible, saying "I was worried when four-year-olds said to me, 'I saw you kill Den.' I don't agree with censorship but there has to be a level of responsibility."

One of the consequences of all the uncertainty behind the scenes was Chrissie's final fate, which was left largely unresolved. Oberman revealed in July 2009 that there were originally plans for a trial, but that poor timing ultimately shelved the storyline. She recalled how the storyline "was put on hold and then there was a whole different team involved after that. I know that if they couldn't get me, Michelle and Kim together, [they wouldn't do it]. And I'd moved straight on to Doctor Who, too. Nobody was available until the following year, by which point Michelle was in Bionic Woman, I was pregnant and Kim was in Cabaret." Because of this "I never felt it was finished off and I would have loved to have wrapped it up." She went on to declare her desire to return for a proper resolution. "I'd love to finish off Chrissie's storyline because I love the character and I do feel that she was left in limbo. To know what happened to her would be great. Even if she went back to say goodbye or wanted to make peace with Sam. Or maybe we could see her in prison?"

In a 2009 interview, Oberman commented on the significance of the character to EastEnders and viewers, saying "I can't believe that I'm still recognised so much as Chrissie. I still get a lot of letters about her, too. I think that she had as much of an impact as Janine (Charlie Brooks) did, which surprised me. Chrissie wasn't around for that long but she was an amazing character with an epic storyline."

Oberman was nominated for a number of awards for her portrayal of Chrissie Watts. In 2004, she was nominated for Most Popular Newcomer at the National Television Awards; she also received four nominations at The British Soap Awards, for Best Newcomer in 2004, Villain of the Year in 2005 and 2006, and Soap Bitch of the Year in 2006. In 2005, she was nominated for Best Actress and Best Bitch at the Inside Soap Awards.

See also
List of EastEnders characters (2004)
List of soap opera villains

References

External links
 

Fictional hairdressers
Fictional bartenders
Fictional female businesspeople
Fictional murderers
Fictional criminals in soap operas
Female villains
Television characters introduced in 2004
Female characters in television
Watts family
Fictional prisoners and detainees